Davyhurst is a Goldfields locality that is situated southwest of Menzies, Western Australia and is approximately  northwest of Kalgoorlie. The proposed townsite was initially declared "Davyston" in 1900. It was also known as Mace's Find and Davyton. Warden Owen of Menzies advised the department the town was better known as "Davyhurst". This was the name used when the town was gazetted in 1901. It is believed to be named after a miner.

Davyhurst is home to the Davyhurst Gold Mine.

References 

Mining towns in Western Australia
Shire of Menzies